The Assault of the Present on the Rest of Time is a film made in West Germany in 1985. It is written and directed by Alexander Kluge. The entire film was filmed in Frankfurt am Main, Hessen, Germany. The film's working title was Unheimlichkeit der Zeit. An alternate English title of the film is The Blind Director.

Cast
Jutta Hoffmann - Gertrud Meinecke
Armin Mueller-Stahl - Blind Director
Hans-Michael Rehberg - Herr von Gerlach
Peter Roggisch - Großer Chef
Rosel Zech - Ärztin
Maria Slatinaru - Sängerin der Tosca
Günther Reich - Sänger des Polizeichefs Scarpia
Piero Visconti - Sänger des Cavaradossi
Edgar M. Böhlke - Schrotthändler
Henning Burk - Heimarbeiter
 - Motivforscher
André Jung - Chauffeur Max
Bernd Schmidt - Reporter
Claudia Buckler - Dienstmädchen Elsa
Rosemarie Fendel - Frau von Gerlach

Awards
At the German Film Awards ceremony of 1986, the film won a "Film Award in Silver" for the Shaping of a Feature Film (Kairos Film). It was also nominated for a "Film Award in Gold" in the category of "Outstanding Feature Film" (Kairos Film).

References
The Assault of the Present on the Rest of Time at strictly film school
The Assault of the Present on the Rest of Time in JSTORL New German Critique
at Mendeley

 (German)
 (German)
 German

External links
 

1985 documentary films
1980s avant-garde and experimental films
German documentary films
German avant-garde and experimental films
West German films
Films directed by Alexander Kluge
1980s German films